Ei Niš (full legal name: Holding-Korporacija Elektronska industrija a.d. Niš) or Electronics Industry Niš, is a holding company with headquarters in Niš, Serbia. It declared bankruptcy in May 2016.

History
It originated in 1948 from the foundation of the Institute for the Production of Radio Sets and X-ray Machines, "RR Niš." In the 1970s and 1980s it was one of the greatest Yugoslavian companies employing over 10 thousand people. However, during the 1990s most of the company business collapsed, due to the war in Yugoslavia, lack of investing in research and sanctions the country was facing.

During the 2000s, the company manufactured acoustic equipment, electronic tubes including cathode-ray tubes, printed plates, electronic machine elements, hydraulics, pneumatics, appliances, air-conditioners, medical equipment, roentgen machines, TV sets, radio receivers, and semiconductors. It was  one of the few remaining makers of electronic vacuum tubes.

In 2016, after decades of insolvency, it declared bankruptcy before regional Business Court.

Elektronska Industrija Niš works in partnership with other European companies, such as Alcatel (telephony),Honeywell, Bull, Silicon graphics (computers), Sagem, Siemens, Hellige, or even ITT or Philips.

See also
 History of computer hardware in Yugoslavia
 List of computer systems from Yugoslavia

References

External links
 
 Elektronska industrija Niš: Od giganta do stečaja at koreni.rs

 
1948 establishments in Serbia
Companies based in Niš
Electronics companies established in 1948
Electronics companies of Serbia
Medical technology companies of Serbia
Vacuum tubes
Serbian brands